Bracha Semeyns de Vries van Doesburgh  (born 2 September 1981) is a Dutch actress. She is well known for her film roles in Too Fat Too Furious, Het Schnitzelparadijs and Dick Maas's Moordwijven. On television, she portrayed Fatima in the prime time series S1NGLE.

Van Doesburgh studied theater in Amsterdam and took acting lessons in New York City. She is married to Dutch actor Daan Schuurmans and they have a daughter named Sophia and twins sons named Kees and Boris.

Filmography
 Schnitzel Paradise (Het Schnitzelparadijs) (2005) - Agnes Meerman
 Too Fat Too Furious (Vet Hard) (2005) - Katja Wielaard
 For a few marbles more (Voor een paar knikkers meer) (2006) - mother of Sofie (voice)
 Faithfully Yours (2022)

Trivia
 Both her acting (Grijpstra & De Gier (2004)) and theatrical debut (Vet hard (2005)) were in a production starring Jack Wouterse.

External links

 YouTube video with Katja Herbers

1981 births
Dutch film actresses
Living people
People from Enschede
Dutch television actresses
21st-century Dutch actresses